This entry is more or less the complete filmography of actress Gertrude Astor.

1915-1916
Under Two Flags (1915, Short) as Venetia
The Shadows of Suspicion (1916, Short) as May Latham
The Janitor's Vacation (1916)

1917

Bombs and Banknotes (Short) as His Daughter
The Devil's Pay Day as Hazel Davidson
Some Specimens (Short) as Nance La Belle
The Scarlet Crystal as Helen Forbes
Polly Redhead as Lady Caroline
A Startling Climax (Short) as Margy Summers
Follow the Tracks (Short) as Gertrude - Lee's Wife
A Darling in Buckskin (Short) as Mrs. Lancaster
By Speshul Delivery (Short)
Heart of Gold (Short) as Rich Mans Wife

The Little Orphan as Emmeline Warren
The Gray Ghost (Serial) as Lady Gwendolyn
The Rescue as Mrs. Hendricks
Cheyenne's Pal (Short) as Flora Belle - the Dance Hall Girl
The Golden Heart (Short) as The Wealthy Lawyer's Wife
The Girl Who Won Out as Mrs. Walsh
 Bondage as Eugenia Darth
The Price of a Good Time as Mis Schyler
The Lash of Power as Phyllis Ward
Bucking Broadway as Gladys (uncredited)

1918
The Guy and the Geyser (Short)
Vamping the Vamp (Short) as Thedeska - the Vamp
The Great Sea Scandal (Short) as Señora Friola
The Girl Who Wouldn't Quit as Stella Carter
Pink Pajamas (Short) as Ethel Doe
The Lion's Claws as Lady Mary Leighton
Mum's the Word (Short) as Mrs. Black
After the War
Shot in the Dumbwaiter (Short) as Mrs. Downs
The Brazen Beauty as Mrs. Augusta Van Ruysdael
Maid Wanted (Short)

1919
The Wicked Darling as Adele Hoyt
Tapering Fingers (Short)
Mixed Tales (Short)
Lay Off! (Short)
The Wife Breakers (Short)
What Am I Bid as Diana Newlands
Destiny as Loraine Haswell
Pretty Smooth as Mrs. Hanson
Missing Husband (Short)      
Loot as Lady Gwendolyn
The Trembling Hour as Mrs. Byrnie
The Lion Man (Serial) as Celeste La Rue

1920
Occasionally Yours as Mona
The Branding Iron as Betty Morena
Burning Daylight as Lucille

1921
The Concert as Eva
Through the Back Door as Louise Reeves
 Who Am I? as Victoria Danforth
Her Mad Bargain as Ruth Beresford
Lucky Carson as Madame Marinoff

1922

Seeing's Believing as Aunt Sue
Beyond the Rocks as Morella Winmarleigh
The Wall Flower as Pamela Shiel
Hurricane's Gal as Phyllis Fairfield
Skin Deep as Mrs. Carlson
Lorna Doone as Countess of Brandir (uncredited)
The Impossible Mrs. Bellew as Alice Granville
The Kentucky Derby as Helen Gordon
You Never Know as Miriam Folansbee
The Ninety and Nine as Kate Van Dyke

1923
Alice Adams as Mildred Palmer
The Ne'er-Do-Well as Edith Cortlandt
Rupert of Hentzau as Paula
Hollywood as Himself (Cameo)
The Six-Fifty as Christine Palmer
Flaming Youth as Annie
The Wanters as Mrs. Van Pelt

1924
Secrets as Mrs. Manwaring
Broadway or Bust as Mrs. Dean Smythe
Daring Love as Music
Fight and Win
 The Torrent as The Cast-Off
All's Swell on the Ocean (Short)
The Silent Watcher as Mrs. Steele
The Ridin' Kid from Powder River as 'Kansas' Lou
Robes of Sin as Adelaide Thomas

1925
Easy Money as Ellen Hale
 The Reckless Sex as Lucile Dupré
Folly of Youth as Evelyn Cartwright
The Charmer as Bertha Sedgwick
 The Verdict as Mrs. Ronsard
Pursued as Madame La Grande
Kentucky Pride as Mrs. Beaumont
The Wife Who Wasn't Wanted as Greta
Satan in Sables as Dolores Sierra
Stage Struck as Lillian Lyons
Laughing Ladies (Short) as The Married Man's Wife
Borrowed Finery as Maisie
The Ship of Souls as Doris Barnes

1926
Behind the Front as French barmaid
Dizzy Daddies (Short) as A Former Flame
Wife Tamers (Short) as Mrs. Barry
Kiki as Paulette Mascar
The Boy Friend as Mrs. White
Don Juan's Three Nights as Baroness von Minden
The Strong Man as 'Lily' of Broadway
Dame Chance as Nina Carrington
The Old Soak as Sylvia De Costa
Tell 'Em Nothing (Short) as Mrs. Gladstone
The Country Beyond as Mrs. Andrews
Sin Cargo as Mary Wickham
The Cheerful Fraud as Rose

1927
Lightning Lariats as Girl
The Taxi Dancer as Kitty Lane
The Cat and the Canary as Cecily
Shanghaied as Bessie
Pretty Clothes as Rose Dunbar
The Irresistible Lover as Dolly Carleton
Uncle Tom's Cabin as Mrs. St. Clare (uncredited)
The Small Bachelor as Fanny
Ginsberg the Great as Sappho
Oh, What a Man! (Short) as The Bandit

1928
The Cohens and the Kellys in Paris as Paulette
Rose-Marie as Wanda
The Family Group (Short)
Five and Ten Cent Annie as Blonde
Hit of the Show as Trece
The Butter and Egg Man as Fanny Lehman
Stocks and Blondes as Goldie
The Naughty Duchess as Ninon
A Woman of Affairs as Party Guest (uncredited)
Chasing Husbands (Short)

1929
Synthetic Sin as Sheila Kelly
The Fatal Warning
Two Weeks Off as Agnes
The Fall of Eve as Mrs. Ford
Twin Beds as Mrs. Solari
Frozen Justice as Moosehide Kate
Untamed as Mrs. Mason

1930
Be Yourself as Lillian
Dames Ahoy! as The Blonde
Live and Learn (Short)
The Boss's Orders (Short) 
The Doctor's Wife (Short)
Over the Radio (Short)

1931
Finger Prints as Jane Madden
Twisted Tales (Short)
Hell Bound as Rosie
Poker Widows (Short) as Mrs. Thomas Regan
Come Clean (Short) as Mrs. Hardy
Wedding Belles (Short)

1932
Running Hollywood (Short) as Herself
In Walked Charley (Short) as Gertrude Henderson, Jackie's Mother
They Never Come Back as Kate
While Paris Sleeps (uncredited)
High Hats and Low Brows (Short) as Mrs. Billingsgate
Western Limited as Mrs. Winters
Flaming Gold as Escort Service Madam (uncredited)
Hesitating Love (Short)
Frisco Jenny as Miss Beulah (uncredited)
Zwei Ritter ohne Furcht und Tadel as 1 Short

1933
Wine, Women and Song as Jennie Tilson
The Plumber and the Lady (Short) as Mrs. Otto Mauser
I Have Lived as Harriet Naisson
Ship of Wanted Men as Vera
Crook's Tour (Short) as Mrs. Dorigan
Carnival Lady as Zandra, Fortune Teller

1934
Guilty Parents as Marie
I'll Take Vanilla (Short) as Junior's Mother (uncredited)
Now I'll Tell as Freddie's wife (scenes deleted)
Washee Ironee (Short) as Woman Hit in Back with Ice Cream
Tailspin Tommy (Serial) as Fake Office Nurse / Taggart's Date - Chs. 7, 9
The Chases of Pimple Street (Short) as Herself, Lucas' Fiancée (uncredited)
The Mighty Barnum as Woman in Museum (uncredited)
Sweet Adeline as Minor Role (uncredited)

1935
Northern Frontier as Mae
The Drunkard as Peggy
Four Hours to Kill! as Little Girl's Mother
Border Brigands as Big Six -Saloon Girl
Okay Toots!
No More Ladies as Nightclub Extra (uncredited)
Honeymoon Limited as Lady Devonshire
Dante's Inferno as Concessionaire's Wife (uncredited)
Broadway Melody of 1936 as Actress in Bob Gordon's Waiting Room (uncredited)
Here Comes the Band as Minor Role (uncredited)
Cappy Ricks Returns as Speaker (uncredited)
It's in the Air (uncredited)
Bad Boy as Minor Role (uncredited)
Manhattan Monkey Business (Short) as Gwendolyn, Surly Patron's Blonde Girlfriend (uncredited)
I Don't Remember (Short) as Sophie Glick (uncredited)

1936
The Mysterious Avenger as Townswoman (uncredited)
The Milky Way as Party Guest (uncredited)
The Great Ziegfeld as Sassy Blonde Anna Held Audience Member (uncredited)
San Francisco as Drunk's Girl (uncredited)
His Brother's Wife as Minor Role (uncredited)
Postal Inspector as Woman with Drumsticks (uncredited)
Straight from the Shoulder (uncredited)
Our Relations as Pirate's Club Customer (uncredited)
 The Magnificent Brute as Townswoman (uncredited)
Empty Saddles as Eloise Hayes
Great Guy as Party Guest (uncredited)

1937
Rich Relations
Easy Living as Saleswoman (uncredited)
Souls at Sea as Barmaid (uncredited)
The Man Who Cried Wolf as Landlady (uncredited)
All Over Town as Mamie
Wells Fargo as Pioneer Woman (uncredited)

1938
The Big Broadcast of 1938 as Woman (uncredited)
Tassels in the Air (Short) as Louella Pindell (uncredited)

1939
The Women as Mud Bath Nurse (uncredited)
Dust Be My Destiny as Dame (uncredited)
$1000 a Touchdown as McGlen Wife (uncredited)
The Llano Kid as Saloon Hostess (uncredited)

1940
The Doctor Takes a Wife as Extra (uncredited)
Misbehaving Husbands as Gossiping Friend

1941
Hold Back the Dawn as Young Woman in Bar (uncredited)
How Green Was My Valley as Bit Part (uncredited)
The Wolf Man (1941) as Townswoman (uncredited)

1942
Lady for a Night as Woman (uncredited)
Frisco Lil as Blackjack Kibitzer (uncredited)
Sleepytime Gal as Wife (uncredited)
Reap the Wild Wind as Ball Guest (uncredited)
Rings on Her Fingers as Tall Woman Exiting Ladies Lounge (uncredited)
Moontide as Woman (uncredited)
Rough on Rents (Short) as Miss Finch, Landlady
Red River Robin Hood as Paul's Wife (uncredited)
Lost Canyon as Mrs. Anson (uncredited)

1943
Idaho as Party Guest (uncredited)
The Avenging Rider as Martha (uncredited)
Petticoat Larceny as Woman on Street (uncredited)
The Kansan as Blonde Townswoman (uncredited)

1944
Weird Woman as Party Guest (uncredited)
The Scarlet Claw as Lady Lillian Gentry Penrose (uncredited)
The Climax as Woman in Audience Behind Franz (uncredited)
Lights of Old Santa Fe as Medley Market Show Spectator (uncredited)
Can't Help Singing as Pioneer Woman - Warren's Mother (uncredited)

1945
Wonder Man as Assistant District Attorney's Wife (uncredited)
Guest Wife as Outraged Woman in Night Club (uncredited)
Swingin' on a Rainbow as Bit (uncredited)
Girls of the Big House as Railroad Matron (uncredited)
Allotment Wives as Marlyn (uncredited)
Man Alive as Madam Zorada (uncredited)
An Angel Comes to Brooklyn as Eva Tanguay (uncredited)
Dick Tracy as Woman (uncredited)

1946
Dragonwyck as Nurse (uncredited)
Crack-Up as Nagging Wife on Train (uncredited)
Sister Kenny as Doctor (uncredited)

1947
Monsieur Verdoux as Garden Party Guest (uncredited)
Calcutta as Nightclub Patron (uncredited)
Fun on a Week-End as Party Guest (uncredited)

1948
Sitting Pretty as Townswoman (uncredited)
Here Comes Trouble as Woman with Dog (uncredited)
Jinx Money as Bank Customer (uncredited)
Music Man as Mrs. Larkin
Joe Palooka in Winner Take All as Mrs. Howard
My Dear Secretary as Miss Gee (uncredited)
3 Godfathers as Saloon Girl (uncredited)

1949
Impact as Note-Taking Reporter in Courtroom (uncredited)
The Beautiful Blonde from Bashful Bend as Towns Woman (uncredited)
Jolson Sings Again (uncredited)
Down Dakota Way as Bus Passenger (uncredited)
Mary Ryan, Detective as Party Guest (uncredited)
The Story of Seabiscuit as Oscar's Wife (uncredited)

1950
The File on Thelma Jordon as Juror (uncredited)
Montana as Woman (uncredited)
Woman in Hiding as Woman in Drugstore (uncredited)
Father Makes Good as Librarian (uncredited)
Caged as Inmate (uncredited)
Sunset Boulevard as Courtier (uncredited)
Bunco Squad as Club Patron (uncredited)
All About Eve as Sarah Siddons Awards Guest (uncredited)
Again... Pioneers as Mrs. Irma Jans
Harvey as Party Guest (uncredited)
Sierra Passage as Show Spectator (uncredited)

1951
The Redhead and the Cowboy as Goldie (uncredited)
A Place in the Sun as Bit Part (uncredited)
Apache Drums as Townswoman (uncredited)
Thunder on the Hill as Village Woman (uncredited)
Chain of Circumstance as Mrs. Sykes (uncredited)
When Worlds Collide as Traveler (uncredited)
Havana Rose as Matron (uncredited)
Disc Jockey as Elderly Woman (uncredited)
The Barefoot Mailman as Townswoman (uncredited)
Crazy Over Horses as Elderly Woman (uncredited)
Elopement as Mother (uncredited)

1952
 The Old West as Townswoman (uncredited)
Scandal Sheet as Neighbor (uncredited)
Jet Job as Dance Partner
Paula as Mrs. Brown (uncredited)
The Rose Bowl Story as Minor Role (uncredited)
I Love Lucy (TV Series, ep. "Ricky Loses His Voice") as Chorus Girl

1953
Angel Face as Matron (uncredited)
Scared Stiff as Wife of Man with Spaghetti on Head (uncredited)
Loose in London as Lady Hightower (uncredited)
Roar of the Crowd as Miss Adams (uncredited)
The Beast from 20,000 Fathoms as Screaming Woman (uncredited)

1954
A Star Is Born as Racetrack Spectator (uncredited)
Deep in My Heart as 'Old Ironsides' - Dorothy's Nurse (uncredited)

1955
Untamed as Ball Guest (uncredited)
Daddy Long Legs as Art Gallery Patron (uncredited)
Wichita as Saloon Girl (uncredited)
How to Be Very, Very Popular (uncredited)
The Virgin Queen as Lady-in-Waiting - 2nd Group (uncredited)
Artists and Models (uncredited)
At Gunpoint as Townswoman (uncredited)

1956
Lux Video Theatre (TV Series, ep. "The Night of January Sixteenth") as Member of the Jury
The Searchers as Wedding Guest (uncredited)
The Boss as Woman at Dedication (uncredited)
Around the World in 80 Days as Extra (uncredited)
Everything But the Truth as Bit Part (uncredited)
Westward Ho, the Wagons! as Wagon Woman (uncredited)

1957
The Oklahoman as Townswoman Gossip (uncredited)
Broken Arrow (TV Series, ep. "Attack on Fort Grant") as Older Woman

1959
Rescue 8 (TV Series, ep. "Walking Death") as Nurse
The Horse Soldiers as Townswoman (uncredited)
The Best of Everything as Leading Woman in Play (uncredited)

1961
All in a Night's Work as Shopper (uncredited)
Two Rode Together as Mrs. Wringle (uncredited)
Twenty Plus Two as Julia Joliet (uncredited)
The Devil's Hand as The Elderly Cultist
The Adventures of Ozzie & Harriet (TV Series, ep. "The Trading Stamps") as Matron

1962
Four Horsemen of the Apocalypse as Woman at Auction / Restaurant Patron (uncredited)
The Man Who Shot Liberty Valance as Townswoman (uncredited)

1964
The New Phil Silvers Show (TV Series, ep. "Auntie Up") as Ingrid
The Unsinkable Molly Brown as Denver Party Guest (uncredited)

1965
The Sound of Music as Party Guest (uncredited)

1966
My Mother the Car (TV Series, ep. "The Incredible Shrinking Car") as Old Lady (final appearance)

External links

Actress filmographies
American filmographies